Toni Juhana Wirtanen (born 4 April 1975, in Heinola, Finland) is a Finnish musician, best known as the vocalist, guitarist and songwriter for the rock band Apulanta.

Wirtanen is also known for having written numerous songs for the Finnish pop singer Irina, and appeared in the 1999 movie Pitkä kuuma kesä, portraying the lead-singer of the school band The Vittupäät.

Discography
Charting hits featured in
2003: "Dynamite" (Beats And Styles featuring Toni W & B.O. Dubb) (Peaked in FIN: #2)
2003: "Asvaltti" (Toni Wirtanen, Infekto, Leijonanmieli, Paarma, Nopsajalka, Bommitommi) (Peaked in FIN: #8)
2014: "Hätähuuto" (Brädi feat. Toni Wirtanen) (Peaked in FIN: #3)
2014: "Sata kesää, tuhat yötä" (Vain elämää, season 3, Paula Koivuniemi Day) (Peaked in FIN: #12)

References

1975 births
Living people
People from Heinola
Finnish male musicians